Harold Teen is a 1934 American pre-Code comedy film directed by Murray Roth and written by Paul Gerard Smith and Alfred A. Cohn. It is based on the comic strip Harold Teen by Carl Ed. The film stars Hal Le Roy, Rochelle Hudson, Patricia Ellis, Guy Kibbee, Hugh Herbert and Hobart Cavanaugh. The film was released by Warner Bros. on April 7, 1934.

Plot

Cast       
Hal Le Roy as Harold Teen
Rochelle Hudson as Lillums Lovewell
Patricia Ellis as Mimi Snatcher
Guy Kibbee as Pa Lovewell
Hugh Herbert as Ed Rathburn
Hobart Cavanaugh as Pop
Chick Chandler as Lilacs
Douglass Dumbrille as Snatcher 
Eddie Tamblyn as Shadow
Clara Blandick as Ma Lovewell
Mayo Methot as Sally LaSalle
Richard Carle as Parmalee 
Charles C. Wilson as McKinse

References

External links
 

1934 films
American comedy films
1934 comedy films
Warner Bros. films
American black-and-white films
Films directed by Murray Roth
1930s English-language films
1930s American films